James Lees (born 14 February 1924) was a British maritime expert and writer who was curator of the ship collection and Senior Conservation Officer at the National Maritime Museum, Greenwich.

Biography 
Born in 1924, James Lees served both in the Royal Navy aboard destroyers and on tankers in the Merchant Navy.

In addition to his active service, Lees (often referred to as "Jim") had a passion for ship modelling, leading him to construct and restore many models of historic vessels.  Many of these are displayed across the world, most notably at the collection of the National Maritime Museum, of which Lees was curator and Senior Conservation Officer.  His expertise on model restoration was utilised on items in "The Tradescant Collection", held at the Ashmolean Museum, University of Oxford.

Lees’ 1979 publication The Masting and Rigging of English Ships of War: 1625–1860, drawn from 15 years of research, is widely regarded as an authority and the definitive study of its respective field.  The author’s intention was to "assist restorers of marine paintings in the difficult task of replacing obliterated rigging, as well as providing a handbook of technical information for the maritime and war historian".

Bibliography

References 

1924 births
British non-fiction writers
British curators
Living people
British male writers
Male non-fiction writers
Royal Navy personnel of World War II